Limbaži Parish is an administrative unit of Limbaži Municipality (previously Limbaži District), Latvia.

Towns, villages and settlements of Limbaži Parish

References 

Parishes of Latvia
Limbaži Municipality